Jorge Aparicio (born 21 November 1992) is a Guatemalan professional footballer who plays as a midfielder for Liga Nacional club Comunicaciones and the Guatemala national team.

He was called up to the Guatemala team for the 2015 CONCACAF Gold Cup; he played in Guatemala's opening game.

Career statistics

Honours
Comunicaciones 
Liga Nacional de Guatemala: Clausura 2013, Apertura 2013, Clausura 2014, Apertura 2014, Clausura 2022
CONCACAF League: 2021

References

External links 

 
 

1992 births
Living people
Guatemalan footballers
Guatemala international footballers
Guatemalan expatriate footballers
2014 Copa Centroamericana players
2015 CONCACAF Gold Cup players
Comunicaciones F.C. players
NK Slaven Belupo players
C.D. Guastatoya players
Liga Nacional de Fútbol de Guatemala players
Croatian Football League players
Expatriate footballers in Croatia
Association football midfielders